Shirley Inman Majors (May 7, 1913 – April 5, 1981) was an American football and baseball coach. He served as the head football coach at Huntland High School in Franklin County, Tennessee from 1949 to 1956 and at Sewanee: The University of the South from 1957 to 1977. At Sewanee, he compiled a record of 93–74–5. His total of 93 wins is the most of any head coach in the history of the Sewanee Tigers football program.

Majors was the patriarch of a football family. His sons included two All-Americans in football at the University of Tennessee, Bobby and Johnny, Bill, who was an assistant at Tennessee until his death in an auto accident in 1965, Larry, who played for Sewanee at wingback, and Joe, who played at Florida State University and with the Houston Oilers of the National Football League. The Majors athletes were inducted into the Tennessee Sports Hall of Fame as a family in 1966.

Majors died on April 5, 1981, after collapsing at the Meadowbrook Game Farm near Westmoreland, Tennessee.

Head coaching record

College football

References

External links
 

1913 births
1981 deaths
Sewanee Tigers baseball coaches
Sewanee Tigers football coaches
High school football coaches in Tennessee
People from Moore County, Tennessee
People from Franklin County, Tennessee
Coaches of American football from Tennessee
Baseball coaches from Tennessee